Gona Ganna Reddy (1262–1296 CE), son of king Gona Budda Reddy who contributed to the Ranganatha Ramayanam as Dwipada Kavyam in the Telugu Language and a military chieftain to one of the few ruling queens Rani Rudrama Devi in Indian history. He ruled Vardhamaanapuram now called as Nandi Vaddeman in Nagarkurnool district. 

Gona Ganna Reddy had two brothers and one sister. They were poets Gona Kacha Reddy, Gona Vitalanatha and Kuppambika. Gona Kacha Reddy and Vitalanatha contributions  include the completion of the Uttarakaanda section in the Ranganatha Ramayanam. Ranganatha’s version was the first and foremost Ramayanam written in Telugu literary history by Gona Budda Reddy. His sister, Kuppambika is known to be the first Telugu poetess as per Buddapuram inscriptions. Kuppambika married Malyala Gundadandadeeshudu, who was also known as Danda Senani.

Gona Ganna Reddy married the love of his life Annaambika, best friend of Rudramadevi. A 400-page Kakatiya historical novel was written by Adavi Baapiraju in 1946.

Khilla Ghanpur, a town in South Telangana near Mahabubnagar and Wanaparthy, also known as Ganapuram, is named after him and the Kakatiya king Ganapati Deva. He constructed several lakes with the help of his brother-in-law Danda Senani during Kakatiya's rule. After Gona Ganna Reddy's death, his brother-in-law, Malyala Gundadandadeeshudu also known as Danda Senani, became the king of Vardhamaanapuram.

Gona Dynasty 
During the Kakatiya dynasty (995–1323), Gona Budda Reddy ruled a kingdom in Mahbubnagar district from Vardhamaanapuram (currently known as Nandi Vaddemaan) and Khilla Ghanpur (Fort Ghanpur) in modern-day Ghanpur, Mahbubnagar district. He and his family, the Gona dynasty, was mostly loyal to the Kakatiya dynasty. When he died, his brother Gona Lakuma Reddy took over the kingdom and rebelled against the Kakatiya, but his son Gona Ganna Reddy remained loyal to them in Vardamanapuram, (1262–1296 AD) indirectly supporting the rule of Kakatiya Queen Rudrama Devi against opposition to female rule.

After the Buddapuram (present-day Bhoothpur) war, Kakatiya's King Prataparudra II married Gona Ganna Reddy's daughter at Khilla Ghanpur fort.

In popular culture
In the 2015 film Rudhramadevi, Gona Ganna Reddy was portrayed by Allu Arjun.

References

Telugu people
Telugu monarchs
1261 births
Year of death unknown